Bruce Gehrke  (September 12, 1924- Apr 6, 1976) was a three sport star Ivy League Hall of Famer, former professional football player for New York Giants in the National football League (NFL) and a winning coach. He won national championship (NCAA) titles in Baseball, Basketball and Football with Columbia Lions where he was the most valuable and popular player.

Early life
Gehrke was born in Long Island, New York and attended Sewanhaka High School in Floral Park, Long Island before attending Columbia University in September 1942. In his first year, he starred on the varsity football, basketball and baseball teams.

The following year, Gehrke played shortstop for Columbia’s 1944 championship baseball team, while training for the Navy. Hugely popular among his teammates and fellow students, Gehrke had that intangible flair for color that made him a crowd pleaser. His play, in every sport, was daring and spectacular, yet he was as crafty a competitor as anyone could have been. Gehrke was also the Coach of his fraternity basketball team in intramural play. He took a break from college when he spent a year with the Navy overseas in Okinawa during World War II. He returned to Columbia for his junior year in September 1946.

Twelve Varsity Letters and Hall of Fame
Gehrke is believed to be the only Columbia University student to earn 12 varsity letters and start for a team i.e. football, basketball, baseball each season.

In his senior year, Gehrke played a major role in Columbia’s 21-20 victory over Army, regarded as one of the greatest Columbia Football games ever played. One of Columbia’s most versatile athletes ever, Gehrke is the last Lion athlete to have lettered all four years in three different varsity sports, other than track and cross country athletes. He graduated from Columbia in 1948, finishing a phenomenal career that included a league title in baseball, two in basketball as well as some of the Lions’ most successful football seasons.
On October 2, 2008 Gehrke was Inducted into hall of fame as a three sport star for the Columbia Lions.

National Football League
Gehrke eventually went on to play for his hometown New York Giants in National Football League and later became a winning coach for over 25 years coaching high school football, basketball, and baseball at Mineola, on his native Long Island. Gehrke was drafted by New York Giants in the 4th round (24th overall) of the 1948 NFL Draft.

References

1924 births
1976 deaths
New York Giants players
Columbia Lions baseball players
Columbia Lions men's basketball players
Columbia Lions football players
United States Navy personnel of World War II
Columbia College (New York) alumni